African Revolution may refer to:
Algerian Revolution or Algerian War (1954–62)
Angolan War of Independence or Angolan Revolution (1961–74)
Egyptian Revolution of 1919
Egyptian Revolution of 1952
Egyptian Revolution of 2011
Ethiopian Revolution
1969 Libyan coup d'état or Libyan Revolution
Libyan Civil War or Libyan Revolution (2011)
Rwandan Revolution (1959–61)

Somali Revolution or Somali Rebellion (1986–92)
Tunisian Revolution (2010–11)
Sudanese war of independence (1956)
Sudanese Revolution of 1964
Sudanese Revolution of 1985
Sudanese Revolution (2018-19)
Zanzibar Revolution (1964)

See also
Arab Spring (2010–present)
List of revolutions and rebellions
List of coups d'état and coup attempts